The third election to the Western Isles Council was held on 6 May 1982 as part of the wider 1982 Scottish regional elections. All candidates stood as Independents. Of the councils 30 councillors, 19 were elected unopposed.

Aggregate results

Ward Results

References

1982 Scottish local elections
1982
May 1982 events in the United Kingdom